The manat (ISO code: AZN; sign: ₼; abbreviation: m) is the currency of Azerbaijan. It is subdivided into 100 gapiks.

The first iteration of the currency happened in the times of the Azerbaijan Democratic Republic and its successor, the Azerbaijan Soviet Socialist Republic, with the issues happening in 1919–1923. The currency underwent hyperinflation, and was eventually substituted by the Transcaucasian ruble, which, in its turn, was converted to the Soviet ruble. In Soviet times, the common currency of the USSR was known as manat in the Azeri language.

When Azerbaijan gained independence from the Soviet Union, it substituted the Soviet ruble with the manat, which also went through a period of high inflation in the first years, rendering the coinage obsolete. The current manat in circulation exists since the denomination in 2006, when 5,000 old manat (AZM) were substituted with the new currency. The currency has mostly been pegged to the US dollar, at what is now the rate of ₼1.70 to US$1.

A lowercase m was used previously, and may still be encountered when the manat symbol is unavailable.

Etymology 
The word "manat" is derived from the Persian word "munāt" and the Russian word "монета" ("moneta") meaning "coin". It was used as the name of the Soviet currency in Azeri and in Turkmen.

First manat, 1919–1923 

The Azerbaijan Democratic Republic and its successor the Azerbaijani Soviet Socialist Republic issued their own currency between 1919 and 1923. The currency was called the manat (منات) in Azerbaijani and the ruble (рубль) in Russian, with the denominations written in both languages (and sometimes also in French) on the banknotes. The manat replaced the first Transcaucasian ruble at par and was replaced by the second Transcaucasian ruble after Azerbaijan became part of the Transcaucasian Soviet Federal Socialist Republic. No subdivisions were issued, and the currency only existed as banknotes.

Banknotes 
The Democratic Republic issued notes in denominations of 25, 50, 100, 250, and 500 manats, whilst the Soviet Socialist Republic issued notes in denominations of 5, 100, 1,000, 5,000, 10,000, 25,000, 50,000, 100,000, 250,000, 1 million, and 5 million manats.

Second manat, 1992–2006 
The second manat was introduced on 15 August 1992. It had the ISO 4217 code AZM and replaced the Soviet ruble at a rate of Rbls 10 to 1 manat.

From early 2002 to early 2005, the exchange rate was fairly stable (varying within a band of 4,770–4,990 manats per US dollar). Starting in the spring of 2005 there was a slight but steady increase in the value of the manat against the US dollar; the reason most likely being the increased flow of petrodollars into the country, together with the generally high price of oil on the world market. At the end of 2005, one dollar was worth 4,591 manats. Banknotes below 100 manats had effectively disappeared by 2005, as had the gapik coins.

Coins 

Coins were issued in denominations of 5, 10, 20, and 50 gapiks, dated 1992 and 1993. Although brass and cupronickel were used for some of the 1992 issues, later issues were all in aluminium. These coins were rarely used in circulation.

Banknotes 
The following banknotes were issued for this currency
 1, 5, 10, 250 manats (all first issued on 15 August 1992)
 50, 100, 500, 1,000 manats (all first issued in early 1993)
 10,000 manats (first issued in August 1994)
 50,000 manats (first issued in May 1996)

Third manat, 2006 
On 1 January 2006, a new manat (ISO 4217 code AZN, also called the "manat (national currency)") was introduced at a ratio of 1 new manat to 5,000 old manats. From 1 October 2005, prices were indicated both in new manats and in old manats to ease the transition. Coins denominated in qəpik, which had not been used from 1993 onward due to inflation, were reintroduced with the re-denomination. The former manat (ISO code 4217 AZM) remained in use through to 31 December 2006.

Symbol 
The new banknotes and Azerbaijani manat symbol, ₼, were designed by Robert Kalina in 2006, and the symbol was added to Unicode (U+20BC) in 2013, after failed addition proposals between 2008 and 2011. The final Azerbaijani Manat symbol design was inspired by the design of the Euro sign (€), based on an initial proposal by Mykyta Yevstifeyev, and resembles a single-bar Euro sign rotated 90° clockwise. The manat symbol is displayed to the right of the amount in Azeri and Russian.

Code 
The new manat was initially assigned the code AYM on being added to the ISO 4217 standard on 1 June 2005, with an effective date of 1 January 2006. However, this was removed and replaced by AZN on 13 October 2005 as it did not comply with the ISO 4217 currency coding standardization rules (which state that currency codes must begin with the ISO 3166-1 alpha-2 code for the relevant country).

Coins 
Coins in circulation are 1, 3, 5, 10, 20 and 50 gapiks.
Most coins closely resemble the size and shape of various euro coins. Most notably the bimetallic 50 gapik (similar to the €2 coin) and the 10 gapik (Spanish flower, like the 20 euro cent coin). Coins were first put into circulation during January 2006 and do not feature a mint year.

Banknotes 
Banknotes in circulation are ₼1, ₼5, ₼10, ₼20, ₼50, ₼100, ₼200, and ₼500. They were designed by Austrian banknote designer Robert Kalina, who also designed the current banknotes of the euro and the Syrian pound. The notes look quite similar to those of the euro and the choice of motifs was inspired by the euro banknotes.

In 2009 the Azərbaycan Milli Bankı (National Bank of Azerbaijan) was renamed the Azərbaycan Respublikasının Mərkəzi Bankı (Central Bank of Azerbaijan). In 2010, the ₼1 banknote was issued with the new name of the issuing bank, in 2012 a ₼5 banknote was issued with the new name of the issuing bank and in 2017 a 100₼ banknote dated 2013 was issued with the new name of the issuing bank.

In 2011 Azerbaijan's Ministry of Finance announced it was considering issuing notes of ₼2 and ₼3 as well as notes with values larger than ₼100. In February 2013 the Central Bank of Azerbaijan announced it would not introduce larger denomination notes until at least 2014.

In 2018, a ₼200 banknote was issued to commemorate Heydar Aliyev's 95th birthday.

Redesigned ₼1, ₼5, and ₼50 banknotes were introduced in 2021, preserving the same motifs but with updated designs. These circulate in parallel with existing notes.

A new commemorative ₼500 banknote was introduced in 2021.

2005 series

2020 refurbishment

Exchange rates 
Before Feb 2015: US$1 = ₼0.78
Feb - Dec 2015: US$1 = ₼1.05
Dec 2015 - Apr 2017: Fluctuate
May 2017 onwards: US$1 = ₼1.7 (pegged)

See also 
 Central Bank of Azerbaijan
 Turkmenistani manat
 Economy of Azerbaijan
 Banking in Azerbaijan

References

External links 
 Der Standard article on the redenomination 
 Azerbaijan Manat: Catalog of Banknotes
 Azerbaijan International. Azerbaijan's New Manats: Design and Transition to a New Currency
 Catalog of Azeri coins and banknotes
 
 The banknotes of Azerbaijan 

Manat
Manat
Manat
Currencies introduced in 1919
Currencies introduced in 1992